Elizabeth Sawyer (died 1621) was a convicted witch during the reign of James I of England.

She lived in Winchmore Hill. She was rumoured to be a witch long before she was charged. Her penchant for oaths and blasphemies had made her suspect, and was claimed to have provided the Devil with his first access to her.

She was accused of having caused the death of Agnes Ratcleife by use of magic, after Ratcleife had struck one of Sawyer's sows that was eating her soap.

It was said that a demon, in the form of a dog named Tom, had appeared before her and seduced her into serving Satan. The Devil was sometimes black and sometimes white, and visited her three times a week as a familiar.

Women were enlisted by the court to search for the witch's mark, and claimed to have found it near Sawyer's anus. This evidently had a strong effect in swinging the jury to conviction. She was judged guilty and executed for witchcraft in 1621.

Her trial was one of the most well publicized witch trials in early-seventeenth-century England, and has been described in a famous pamphlet by the Reverend Henry Goodcole: The Wonderfull Discoverie of Elizabeth Sawyer, a Witch (1621)

The story was the inspiration for Thomas Dekker's play, The Witch of Edmonton.

References

Notes

Year of birth missing
17th-century English women
17th-century English people
Executed English women
People executed by Stuart England
Winchmore Hill
1621 deaths
People executed for witchcraft
Witch trials in England